LG UX is an Android-based mobile operating system developed and maintained by LG Electronics independently of Google exclusively for its smartphones.

There are different versions for each LG phone, and each version has variants according to the regions in which the phone is sold, such as China, Japan, Pakistan, Russia, Indonesia, India, Taiwan and Turkey. 

The original name of LG UX is Optimus UI, renamed to the current name with the launch of the LG G4 and the release of LG UX 4.0, with older versions retroactively renamed to LG UX.

Version history

Devices running LG UX

High-end Phones 

LG Wing

G Series 
 LG G4
 LG G4 Beat
 LG G4 Stylus
 LG G Vista 2
 LG G5
 LG G5 SE
 LG G6
 LG G6+
 LG G7 ThinQ
 LG G8 ThinQ
 LG G8S ThinQ
 LG G8X ThinQ
 LG Velvet

V Series 
 LG V10
 LG V20
 LG V30
 LG V30+
 LG V30 Signature Edition
 LG V35 ThinQ
 LG V40 ThinQ
 LG V45 ThinQ
 LG V50 ThinQ 5G
 LG V60 ThinQ

Mid to Low-end Phones

K Series 
 LG K62
 LG K61
 LG K52
 LG K51
 LG K42
 LG K41
 LG K31
 LG K22
 LG K10
 LG K8
 LG K7
 LG K5
 LG K4
 LG K3
 LG K20 Plus
 LG K10 (2017)
 LG K8 (2017)
 LG K4 (2017)
 LG K3 (2017)

Q Series 
 LG Q6
 LG Q7
 LG Q8 2017
 LG Q8 2018

X Series 
 LG X Screen
 LG X Cam
 LG X Charge
 LG X Style
 LG X Power
 LG X Power 2
 LG X Mach
 LG X Max
 LG X5
 LG X Skin
 LG X Venture

Stylus (Stylo) Series 
 LG G Stylo
 LG Stylus 2
 LG Stylus 2 Plus
 LG Stylus 3
 LG Stylus 3 Plus
 LG Stylus 4
 LG Q Stylo
 LG Stylo 5

Other Series 
 LG Magna

 LG Bello 2
 LG Zero
 LG Ray

Tablets 
 LG G Pad X
 LG G Pad III 8.0
 LG G Pad III 10.1
 LG G Pad IV 8.0
 LG G Pad 5 10.1

References

LG Electronics
Android (operating system) software
Custom Android firmware